The Second Haniyeh Government, also known as the Palestinian National Unity Government of March 2007, was a Palestinian Authority unity government headed by Ismail Haniyeh, the Prime Minister of the Palestinian National Authority that was formed on 17 March 2007 and dissolved on 14 June 2007.

The Unity Government was formed on 17 March 2007 following negotiations in Mecca, but due to failing international support (because it did not meet the Quartet conditions), it was short-lived. Israel immediately rejected the Government and said it will deal with Abbas, but not with the new government unless it recognizes the Jewish state. Israeli officials said they would try to persuade the world not to deal with the government.

The Government was dissolved by President Mahmoud Abbas on 14 June 2007 after the Hamas takeover of Gaza.

Background 
Hamas decisively won the 2006 Palestinian legislative election held on 25 January 2006. Israel and the Quartet on the Middle East had previously stated that their continued aid to and dialogue with the PA under a Hamas government was conditional on Hamas agreeing to three conditions: recognition of Israel, the disavowal of violent actions, and acceptance of previous agreements between Israel and the PA, including the Oslo Accords. Haniya refused to accept these conditions. On the day the First Haniyeh Government was sworn in, on 29 March, Israel and the Quartet stopped all dialogue with the PA and especially any member of the Hamas government, ceased providing aid to the PA and imposed sanctions against the PA under Hamas. Israel had also withheld the transfers of PA revenues for more than a year.

Fatah developed a plan to replace the Hamas-government. According to the plan, a national unity government or a "government of technocrats" would be formed and prepare early presidential and legislative elections. If the establishment of a government meeting the Quartet conditions would fail, President Abbas would announce a state of emergency, dismiss the present cabinet and form an emergency government, or call for early elections. The plan was, for the time being, not carried out in full, as indeed a "unity government" was formed in March 2007.

Timeline
On 25 January 2006, Hamas won the elections for the Palestinian Legislative Council (PLC).

On 29 March 2006, the First Haniyeh-led PA government was sworn in. Israel, the United States, the European Union and several other countries impose sanctions against the PA, including suspension of all international aid.

On 17 June 2006, a temporary international mechanism was created to channel aid to Palestinians bypassing the Hamas-led PA government, including paying aid funds directly to the accounts of President Abbas.

On 8 February 2007, negotiations resulted in the Fatah–Hamas Mecca Agreement to form a Palestinian national unity government. The agreement was signed by Abbas on behalf of Fatah and by Khaled Mashal on behalf of Hamas. The agreement also contained a "letter of commission" from Abbas to Haniyeh, calling on Haniyeh as premier of the next government to achieve Palestinian national goals as approved by the Palestine National Council, the Basic Law and the National Reconciliation Document (the Prisoners' Document) as well as the decisions of the Arab summit.

On 17 March 2007, Haniyeh presented the national unity government to the PLC, which was approved 83–3. At the time, 41 of the 132 members of the PLC were in Israeli detention. The 25 ministers were sworn in the next day by President Abbas. The program of the national unity government included ending the Israeli occupation of the Palestinian territories and recognizing the right to self-determination of the Palestinian people, and the establishment of the independent Palestinian state with full sovereignty within the 1967 borders, with al-Quds as its capital, implementation of the Cairo Agreement pertaining to the PLO, and commitment to the Palestinian right of return. Israel rejected the new government.

Between 10 and 14 June 2007, Hamas took control of the Gaza Strip after fierce battles between Fatah and Hamas.

On 14 June 2007, President Abbas declared a state of emergency by presidential decree, and dismissed the Haniyeh-led unity government. He appointed an emergency government led by Salam Fayyad and controversially suspended articles of the Basic Law to dispense with the need for PLC approval of the new government. The Fayyad government was swiftly recognized by the international community. Haniyeh and Hamas have refused to accept the dismissal, and continues to claim it is the legitimate caretaker government of the Palestinian Authority on the basis that the PLC, which continues to be controlled by Hamas, has not approved the new government.

Members of the Government
March to June 2007

See also
Palestinian government

References

Palestinian Authority Government of 2007 03
Coalition governments
2007 establishments in the Palestinian territories
2007 disestablishments in the Palestinian territories
Cabinets established in 2007
Cabinets disestablished in 2007